Food coloring, or color additive, is any dye, pigment, or substance that imparts color when it is added to food or drink. They come in many forms consisting of liquids, powders, gels, and pastes. Food coloring is used in both commercial food production and domestic cooking. Food colorants are also used in a variety of non-food applications, including cosmetics, pharmaceuticals, home craft projects, and medical devices.

Purpose of food coloring

People associate certain colors with certain flavors, and the color of food can influence the perceived flavor in anything from candy to wine. Sometimes, the aim is to simulate a color that is perceived by the consumer as natural, such as adding red coloring to glacé cherries (which would otherwise be beige), but sometimes it is for effect, like the green ketchup that Heinz launched in 2000. Color additives are used in foods for many reasons including:
 To make food more attractive, appealing, appetizing, and informative
 Offset color loss due to exposure to light, air, temperature extremes, moisture and storage conditions
 Correct natural variations in color
 Enhance colors that occur naturally
 Provide color to colorless and "fun" foods
 Allow consumers to identify products on sight, like candy flavors or medicine dosages

Regulation
While naturally derived colors are not required to be certified by a number of regulatory bodies throughout the world (including the U.S. FDA), they still need to be approved for use in the respective country. Food colorings are tested for safety by various bodies around the world and sometimes different bodies have different views on food color safety.

Canadian regulations
Food in Canada cannot be sold with more than:
 300 ppm of dyes including allura red, amaranth, erythrosine, indigotine, sunset yellow FCF or tartrazine or any combination of these unless specified
 100 ppm of fast green FCF or brilliant blue FCF or any combination of these
 300 ppm of allura red, amaranth, erythrosine, indigotine, sunset yellow FCF or tartrazine and fast green FCF or brilliant blue FCF combined
 150 ppm of ponceau SX dye.

U.S. regulations

The U.S. FDA's permitted colors are classified as subject to certification or exempt from certification in Code of Federal Regulations – Title 21 Part 73 & 74, both of which are subject to rigorous safety standards prior to their approval and listing for use in foods.
 Certified colors are synthetically produced and are used widely because they impart an intense, uniform color, are less expensive, and blend more easily to create a variety of hues. There are nine certified color additives approved for use in the United States. Certified food colors generally do not add undesirable flavors to foods.
 Colors that are exempt from certification include pigments derived from natural sources such as vegetables, minerals, or animals. Nature derived color additives are typically more expensive than certified colors and may add unintended flavors to foods. Examples of exempt colors include annatto, beet extract, caramel, beta-carotene, turmeric and grape skin extract. This list contains substances which may have synthetic origins, such as nature identical beta-carotene.

In the United States, FD&C numbers (which indicate that the FDA has approved the colorant for use in foods, drugs and cosmetics) are given to approved synthetic food dyes that do not exist in nature, while in the European Union, E numbers are used for all additives, both synthetic and natural, that are approved in food applications. The food colors are known by E numbers that begin with a 1, such as E100 (turmeric) or E161b (lutein). The safety of food colors and other food additives in the EU is evaluated by the European Food Safety Authority. Color Directive 94/36/EC, enacted by the European Commission in 1994, outlines permitted natural and artificial colors with their approved applications and limits in different foodstuffs. This is binding to all member countries of the EU. Any changes have to be implemented into their national laws within a given time frame. In non-EU member states, food additives are regulated by their national authorities, which usually, but not in all cases, try to harmonize with the laws adopted by the EU. Most other countries have their own regulations and list of food colors which can be used in various applications, including maximum daily intake limits.

Permitted synthetic colorants

E.U.
E numbers 102–143 cover the range of artificial colors. The EU maintains a list of currently allowed additives. Some artificial dyes approved for food use in the EU include:
 E104: Quinoline yellow
 E122: Carmoisine
 E124: Ponceau 4R
 E131: Patent blue V
 E142: Green S

U.S.
In the US, the following seven artificial colorings are generally permitted in food (the most common in bold) . The lakes of these colorings are also permitted except the lake of Red No. 3.
 FD&C Blue No. 1 – Brilliant blue FCF, E133 (blue shade)
 FD&C Blue No. 2 – Indigotine, E132 (indigo shade)
 FD&C Green No. 3 – Fast green FCF, E143 (turquoise shade)
 FD&C Red No. 3 – Erythrosine, E127 (pink shade, commonly used in glacé cherries)
 FD&C Red No. 40 – Allura red AC, E129 (red shade)
 FD&C Yellow No. 5 – Tartrazine, E102 (yellow shade)
 FD&C Yellow No. 6 – Sunset yellow FCF, E110 (orange shade)

Two dyes are allowed by the FDA for limited applications:

 Citrus red 2 (orange shade) – allowed only to color orange peels.
 Orange B (red shade) – allowed only for use in hot dog and sausage casings (not produced after 1978, but never delisted)

Many dyes have been delisted for a variety of reasons, ranging from poor coloring properties to regulatory restrictions. Some of these delisted food colorants are:
 FD&C Red No. 2 – Amaranth, E123
 FD&C Red No. 4 – Scarlet GN, E125
 FD&C Red No. 32 was used to color Florida oranges.
 FD&C Orange Number 1 was one of the first water-soluble dyes to be commercialized, and one of seven original food dyes allowed under the Pure Food and Drug Act of June 30, 1906.
 FD&C Orange No. 2 was used to color Florida oranges.
 FD&C Yellow No. 1, 2, 3, and 4
 FD&C Violet No. 1

India
As per the Food Safety and Standard Act, 2006 In India, the following eight artificial colourings are generally permitted in food.

Global harmonization
Since the beginning of the 1960s, JECFA has promoted the development of international standards for food additives, not only by its toxicological assessments, which are continuously published by the WHO in a "Technical Report Series", but furthermore by elaborating appropriate purity criteria, which are laid down in the two volumes of the "Compendium of Food Additive Specifications" and their supplements. These specifications are not legally binding but very often serve as a guiding principle, especially in countries where no scientific expert committees have been established.

In order to further regulate the use of these evaluated additives, in 1962 the WHO and FAO created an international commission, the Codex Alimentarius, which is composed of authorities, food industry associations and consumer groups from all over the world. Within the Codex organization, the Codex Committee for Food Additives and Contaminants is responsible for working out recommendations for the application of food additives: the General Standard for Food Additives. In the light of the World Trade Organizations General Agreement on Tariffs and Trade (GATT), the Codex Standard, although not legally binding, influences food color regulations all over the world.

Natural food dyes

Carotenoids (E160, E161, E164), chlorophyllin (E140, E141), anthocyanins (E163), and betanin (E162) comprise four main categories of plant pigments grown to color food products. Other colorants or specialized derivatives of these core groups include:
 Annatto (E160b), a reddish-orange dye made from the seed of the achiote
 Caramel coloring (E150a-d), made from caramelized sugar
 Carmine (E120), a red dye derived from the cochineal insect, Dactylopius coccus
 Elderberry juice (E163)
 Lycopene (E160d)
 Paprika (E160c)
 Turmeric/curcumin (E100)

Blue colors are especially rare. One feasible blue dye currently in use is derived from spirulina. Some recent research has explored associating anthocyanins with other phenolics or aluminium ions to develop blue colours. However, the inherent problems posed by the nature of the food matrix, and the need for long‐term stability, makes this a very difficult objective. The pigment genipin, present in the fruit of Gardenia jasminoides, can be treated with amino acids to produce the blue pigment gardenia blue, which is approved for use in Japan but not the EU or the US.

To ensure reproducibility, the colored components of these substances are often provided in highly purified form. For stability and convenience, they can be formulated in suitable carrier materials (solid and liquids). Hexane, acetone, and other solvents break down cell walls in the fruit and vegetables and allow for maximum extraction of the coloring. Traces of these may still remain in the finished colorant, but they do not need to be declared on the product label. These solvents are known as carry-over ingredients.

Criticism and health implications
Widespread public belief that artificial food coloring causes ADHD-like hyperactivity in children originated from Benjamin Feingold, a pediatric allergist from California, who proposed in 1973 that salicylates, artificial colors, and artificial flavors cause hyperactivity in children; however, there is no evidence to support broad claims that food coloring causes food intolerance and ADHD-like behavior in children. It is possible that certain food colorings may act as a trigger in those who are genetically predisposed, but the evidence is weak.

Despite concerns expressed that food colorings may cause ADHD-like behavior in children, the collective evidence does not support this assertion. The U.S. FDA and other food safety authorities regularly review the scientific literature, and led the UK Food Standards Agency (FSA) to commission a study by researchers at Southampton University of the effect of a mixture of six food dyes (tartrazine, allura red, ponceau 4R, quinoline yellow, sunset yellow and carmoisine (dubbed the "Southampton 6")) on children in the general population. These colorants are found in beverages. The study found "a possible link between the consumption of these artificial colours and a sodium benzoate preservative and increased hyperactivity" in the children; the advisory committee to the FSA that evaluated the study also determined that because of study limitations, the results could not be extrapolated to the general population, and further testing was recommended. The U.S. FDA did not make changes following the publication of the Southampton study. Following a citizen petition filed by the Center for Science in the Public Interest in 2008, requesting the FDA ban several food additives, the FDA reviewed the available evidence, and still made no changes.

The European regulatory community, with an emphasis on the precautionary principle, required labelling and temporarily reduced the acceptable daily intake (ADI) for the food colorings; the UK FSA called for voluntary withdrawal of the colorings by food manufacturers. However, in 2009 the EFSA re-evaluated the data at hand and determined that "the available scientific evidence does not substantiate a link between the color additives and behavioral effects" for any of the dyes.

History of artificial food colorants
The addition of colorants to foods is thought to have occurred in Egyptian cities as early as 1500 BC, when candy makers added natural extracts and wine to improve the products' appearance. During the Middle Ages, the economy in the European countries was based on agriculture, and the peasants were accustomed to producing their own food locally or trading within the village communities. Under feudalism, aesthetic aspects were not considered, at least not by the vast majority of the generally very poor population. This situation changed with urbanization at the beginning of the Modern Age, when trade emerged—especially the import of precious spices and colors. One of the first food laws, created in Augsburg, Germany, in 1531, concerned spices or colorants and required saffron counterfeiters to be burned.

With the onset of the industrial revolution, people became dependent on foods produced by others. These new urban dwellers demanded food at low cost. Analytical chemistry was still primitive and regulations few. The adulteration of foods flourished. Heavy metal and other inorganic element-containing compounds turned out to be cheap and suitable to "restore" the color of watered-down milk and other foodstuffs, some more lurid examples being:
 Red lead (Pb3O4) and vermillion (HgS) were routinely used to color cheese and confectionery.
 Copper arsenite (CuHAsO3) was used to recolor used tea leaves for resale. It also caused two deaths when used to color a dessert in 1860.

Sellers at the time offered more than 80 artificial coloring agents, some invented for dyeing textiles, not foods.  Many color additives had never been tested for toxicity or other adverse effects. Historical records show that injuries, even deaths, resulted from tainted colorants. In 1851, about 200 people were poisoned in England, 17 of them fatally, directly as a result of eating adulterated lozenges. In 1856, mauveine, the first synthetic color, was developed by Sir William Henry Perkin and by the turn of the century, unmonitored color additives had spread through Europe and the United States in all sorts of popular foods, including ketchup, mustard, jellies, and wine. Originally, these were dubbed 'coal-tar' colors because the starting materials were obtained from bituminous coal.

Synthetic dyes are often less costly and technically superior to natural dyes.

History of regulation
Concerns over food safety led to numerous regulations throughout the world. German food regulations released in 1882 stipulated the exclusion of dangerous "minerals" such as arsenic, copper, chromium, lead, mercury, and zinc, which were frequently used as ingredients in colorants. In contrast to today's regulatory guidelines, these first laws followed the principle of a negative listing (substances not allowed for use); they were already driven by the main principles of today's food regulations all over the world, since all of these regulations follow the same goal: the protection of consumers from toxic substances and from fraud. In the United States, the Pure Food and Drug Act of 1906 reduced the permitted list of synthetic colors from 700 down to seven. The seven dyes initially approved were Ponceau 3R (FD&C Red No. 1), amaranth (FD&C Red No. 2), erythrosine (FD&C Red No. 3), indigotine (FD&C Blue No. 2), light green SF (FD&C Green No. 2), naphthol yellow 1 (FD&C Yellow No. 1), and orange 1 (FD&C Orange No. 1). Even with updated food laws, adulteration continued for many years.

In the 20th century, improved chemical analysis and testing led to the replacement of the negative lists by positive listings. Positive lists consist of substances allowed to be used for the production and the improvement of foods. Most prevailing legislations are based on positive listing. Positive listing implies that substances meant for human consumption have been tested for their safety, and that they have to meet specified purity criteria prior to their approval by the corresponding authorities. In 1962, the first EU directive (62/2645/EEC) approved 36 colorants, of which 20 were naturally derived and 16 were synthetic. This directive did not list which food products the colorants could or could not be used in. At that time, each member state could designate where certain colors could and could not be used. In Germany, for example, quinoline yellow was allowed in puddings and desserts, but tartrazine was not. The reverse was true in France. This was updated in 1989 with 89/107/EEC, which concerned food additives authorized for use in foodstuffs.

Chemical structures of representative colorants

See also

 Azo compound
 Acid dye
 E number
 Federal Food, Drug, and Cosmetic Act
 Food additive

References

External links
 FDA/CFSAN Food Color Facts
 Natural Food Colors (Food-Info)
 Report on the Certification of Color Additives by U.S. FDA
 NATCOL: What are natural food colours?
 CSPI: Food Dyes Pose Rainbow of Risks

 
Food additives
Food technology